Sector may refer to:

Places
 Sector, West Virginia, U.S.

Geometry
 Circular sector, the portion of a disc enclosed by two radii and a circular arc
 Hyperbolic sector, a region enclosed by two radii and a hyperbolic arc
 Spherical sector, a portion of a sphere enclosed by a cone of radii from the center of the sphere

Social and economic 

 Business sector, part of the economy which involves the trading and sale of products by companies
 Economic sector, the manufacturing, finance and production of goods for consumers
 Private sector, business activity created by private enterprise for profit
 Public sector, delivers social services, infrastructure and institutions administered by government
 Voluntary sector, a non-profit and voluntary part of an economy provided by organisations
 The sector of the sector directive in government procurement in the European Union

Computing
 Cylinder-head-sector, an early method for giving addresses to blocks of data on a hard drive
 Disk sector, a subdivision of a track on a disk
 Sector, or zone, in portal rendering 
 Sector/Sphere, an open source software suite 
 Sector (instrument), a historic calculating instrument

Other uses
 Sector (country subdivision)
 United States Coast Guard Sector, a shore-based unit of the U.S. Coast Guard
 Sector, a fictional area of space, e.g. in the Foundation series, Star Wars, StarCraft, Warhammer 40,000, Lollipop Chainsaw
 Sector, or galactic quadrant, regions of space in Star Trek
 Sector, and Sector No Limits, watch brands

See also

 Area (disambiguation)
 Region (disambiguation)
 Zone (disambiguation)
 Sectoria, a small genus of stone loaches